Judith Patricia Armitage  (born 1951) is a British molecular and cellular biochemist at the University of Oxford.

Early life and education
Armitage was born on 21 February 1951 in Shelley, Yorkshire, England. She attended Selby Girls' High School, an all-female grammar school, then located in the West Riding of Yorkshire. In her sixth form, the school became the co-educational Selby Grammar School.

Armitage earned a BSc in Microbiology at University College London in 1972, and was awarded a PhD in 1976 for research on the bacterium Proteus mirabilis. She remained at UCL in the laboratory of Micheal Evans for her postdoctoral work.

Research and career
Armitage's research is largely based on the motion of bacteria by flagellar rotation and the chemotactic mechanisms used to control that motion. Armitage was appointed Lecturer in Biochemistiry at Oxford in 1985 and was awarded the Title of Distinction of Professor of Biochemistry in 1996. Armitage is a fellow of Merton College, Oxford and has served as Director of the Oxford University Centre for Integrative Systems Biology since 2006.

Armitage was elected President of the Microbiology Society for 2019.

Awards and honours
Armitage was awarded a Lister Institute Research Fellowship in 1982.

In 2010 Armitage was elected a member of the European Molecular Biology Organisation and in 2011 was elected a Fellow of the American Academy of Microbiology and a Fellow of the Royal Society of Biology.

Armitage was elected a Fellow of the Royal Society (FRS) in 2013. Her nomination reads:

In January 2019 she was elected president of the Microbiology Society for a term of three years.

References

Living people
1951 births
Academics of the University of Oxford
Alumni of University College London
British biochemists
Fellows of Merton College, Oxford
Female Fellows of the Royal Society
People from Selby
Women biochemists
20th-century British women scientists
21st-century British women scientists
Fellows of the American Academy of Microbiology